Kindergarten is a US children’s documentary miniseries that debuted in 2001 on HBO Family's Jam morning block in 2001. The unscripted show follows 23 students in a kindergarten class at the Upper Nyack Elementary School in Upper Nyack, New York.

Cast

Adult Characters 
(Played as themselves):

Ms. Jennifer Vaz Johnson- Main Teacher

Mrs. Mary Ann Matheson- Assistant Teacher to Ms. Johnson

Mr. Buzz Ostrowsky- The Principal
 
Lara's Mom 

Amanda's Mom

Santa Claus (appeared in Hooray for Holidays only)

Joelle's Mom

Child Cast 
Aaron
Amanda
Anna
Anna Belle
Ben
Carly
Christopher
Conor
Dana
Jillian
Joelle
Jonas
Julia
Julian
Karimah
Lara
Lauren
Matthew
Nat
Nicola
Lourde Quincy Vasser
Tyeese
William

Episodes

Home media
A complete series 4-volume tape set was released on August 13, 2002

The series was later released on HBO Max

References

HBO original programming
2000s American children's television series
2000s American documentary television series
2000s American television miniseries
2001 American television series debuts
2001 American television series endings
2000s preschool education television series
American preschool education television series
English-language television shows
Television series about children
Television shows set in New York (state)

Television series by Home Box Office